Casciotta d'Urbino or Casciotta di Urbino is a type of Caciotta cheese, made in the Province of Pesaro and Urbino in the Marche region, central Italy.

This cheese is generally made of between 70 and 80% sheep milk with 20-30% cow's milk.

First made in ancient times, this cheese, it is said was a favourite of Michelangelo and Pope Clement XIV.

Local legend has it that the name came about from a mis-pronunciation of 'Caciotta' by a local civil servant, some say it is derived from the local dialect.

References

Rubino, R., et al. (2005), Italian Cheese, 
Formaggio.it - Profile (Italian)

External links 
Official Site

Italian cheeses
Cow's-milk cheeses
Sheep's-milk cheeses
Italian products with protected designation of origin
Cheeses with designation of origin protected in the European Union
Urbino